Scyphacidae is a family of woodlice in the order Isopoda. There are about 7 genera and more than 30 described species in Scyphacidae.

Genera
These seven genera belong to the family Scyphacidae:
 Actaecia Dana, 1853
 Haloniscus Chilton, 1920
 Marioniscus Barnard, 1932
 Quelpartoniscus Kwon, 1995
 Scyphacella Smith, 1873
 Scyphax Dana, 1853
 Scyphoniscus Chilton, 1901

References

Further reading

 

Woodlice
Crustacean families